Ginásio Municipal Tancredo Neves is an indoor sporting arena located in Uberlândia, Brazil.  The capacity of the arena is 8,000 spectators and opened in 2007.  It hosts indoor sporting events such as basketball and volleyball, and also hosts concerts. It stands just to the east of Estádio Parque do Sabiá.

The arena is named after Tancredo Neves, a politician who had died shortly before taking office as the new president of Brazil in 1985.

The arena will host for the first time an UFC event on November 8, 2014.

References

External links
Arena information
Article on arena

Indoor arenas in Brazil
Sports venues in Minas Gerais
Sports venues completed in 1988